Radio Orfey (Russian: Радио Орфей) ("Radio Orpheus") is a Russian radio station broadcasting classical music from studios in Moscow. Its programmes – which are broadcast on FM from transmitters in Moscow (99.2 MHz), Saint Petersburg (71.66 MHz), Yekaterinburg (69.92 MHz), Volgograd (71.33 MHz), Perm (66.8 MHz), Lipetsk (70.07 MHz), Tula (71.93 MHz), Kurgan (106 MHz), and Smolensk (104.3 MHz) –
are also streamed on the Internet.

The station, which was created in August 1960, has had various owners throughout its history:
1960-1991: All-Union Radio
1991-1995: State TV and Radio Company "Ostankino"
1995-2007: the All-Russian State Television and Radio Broadcasting Company
2007–present: the Russian State TV and Radio Music Centre (a self-governing state-owned enterprise)

External links
Radio Orpheus website

1960 establishments in Russia
Classical music radio stations
Mass media in Moscow
Radio stations established in 1960
Radio stations in Russia
Radio stations in the Soviet Union